In Greek mythology, Celeus is a Cretan man who attempted to steal from Zeus, the king of gods, and was punished for it. He was transformed into an woodpecker for attempting to steal from him.

Mythology 
The Cretan Celeus and three other men, Cerberus, Aegolius and Laius entered the sacred cave of Zeus in Crete where the young god had been born and brought up with the aim to steal some of the sacred honey produced by Zeus's bee nurses. Zeus thundered and stripped them of their brazen armors. He meant to kill them all, but Themis and the Fates advised Zeus against doing that, saying the cave as a holy place should not have anyone be killed inside it. So Zeus turned them all into birds instead; Celeus became an woodpecker. Celeus shares a name with a mythical king of Eleusis.

Legacy 
A woodpecker species native to the Americas is named Celeus.

See also 

 Pandareus
 Tantalus
 Pyrrhus

References

Bibliography 
 Antoninus Liberalis, The Metamorphoses of Antoninus Liberalis translated by Francis Celoria (Routledge 1992). Online version at the Topos Text Project.
 
  
 William Smith, A Dictionary of Greek and Roman Biography and Mythology, London. John Murray: printed by Spottiswoode and Co., New-Street Square and Parliament Street, 1873.

Cretan characters in Greek mythology
Deeds of Zeus
Metamorphoses into birds in Greek mythology